Miss Guyana is the national competition in Guyana where the Titleholder/National Winner represents Guyana at the Miss World competition. Guyana first placed at the Miss World competition in 1966 which was the first of six consecutive placements from semifinalist to top 3 finish from 1966 to 1971.[3] The Miss Guyana trademark is under Natasha Martindale directorship.

History

Miss Guyana
Since 1966 Miss Guyana was known as the Independent Queen whose winners represented Guyana at the Miss World contest. The first Miss Guyana was Umblita Van Sluytman from Georgetown. She became Guyana's first representative at the Miss World competition in London, in November 1966. A UPI photograph of her dancing on a table in her navel-baring, minimal costume for the pageant was published in many newspapers. She placed as a semifinalist.

Seasons
1967: Shakira Baksh, the 1967 Miss Guyana, went on to become a runner-up at the Miss World 1967 pageant. Baksh married British actor Michael Caine six years later, becoming his second wife.
2009: Imarah Radix was named Miss Guyana World in 2009 and went on to compete at the Miss World 2009 pageant in South Africa.
2009: In the United Kingdom in 2009, a gynaecologist was accused of giving an orgasm to a patient who allegedly claimed to be a former Miss Guyana World winner, but the patient denied having made this claim.
2010: Aletha Shepherd, who was Miss Guyana World 2010, went on to compete in the Miss Asia Pacific World pageant the following year, from which she withdrew after allegedly being sexually harassed by the pageant's sponsors and racially discriminated against by the judges.
2012: Arti Cameron, a pre-medical student, was crowned Miss Guyana World. That July, Cameron appeared at the JRG Bikini Under the Bridge Fashion Show in New York City, New York, United States. It is traditional for beauty queens to be tall in order to better showcase their legs, but Cameron was one of several contestants at Miss World 2012 who were petite.
2013: Natasha Martindale took over the leadership of the Miss Guyana World pageant, replacing Ken Chung who had previously filled that role.
2014: Rafieya Husain was crowned Miss World Guyana 2014 on May 26, 2014. The 22-year-old scooped the top prize at the event held at the National Cultural Centre. Speaking after collecting her prize, Rafieya promised to work with various organisations to fight the scourge of domestic violence, by tackling it from the grassroot level. In addition, she is optimistic that she has what it takes to bring home the Miss World crown later in the year. The 1st runner up was Atisha Gaskill, with Denicia Williams 2nd runner up.

Miss World Guyana
Color key

Miss Universe Guyana

References

External links

Beauty pageants in Guyana
Recurring events established in 1956
Guyanese awards
Guyana
Annual events in Guyana